Lessons of Darkness is a 1992 film directed by Werner Herzog. Shot in documentary style on 16-millimetre film from the perspective of an almost alien observer, the film is an exploration of the ravaged oil fields of post-Gulf War Kuwait, decontextualised and characterised in such a way as to emphasise the terrain's cataclysmic strangeness. An effective companion to his earlier film Fata Morgana, Herzog again perceives the desert as a landscape with its own voice.

A co-production with Paul Berriff, the film was financed by the television studios Canal+ and Première.

Synopsis
The film is a meditation on catastrophe, contextualised through the literary modes of religion and science fiction. It begins with a quotation, attributed to Blaise Pascal: "The collapse of the stellar universe will occur – like creation – in grandiose splendor." This attribution is apocryphal, as the text was in fact written by Herzog for the film and chosen, like the music, to give the film a certain mood. The prologue of the quotation is followed by thirteen sections, denoted by numbered title cards: "A Capital City", "The War", "After the Battle", "Finds from Torture Chambers", "Satan's National Park", "Childhood", "And a Smoke Arose like a Smoke from a Furnace", "A Pilgrimage", "Dinosaurs on the Go", "Protuberances", "The Drying Up of the Source", "Life Without the Fire" and "I am so tired of sighing; Lord, let it be night".

Mostly devoid of commentary, the imagery concentrates on the aftermath of the first Gulf War – specifically on the Kuwaiti oil fires, although no relevant political or geographical information is mentioned. Herzog intended to alienate the audience from images to which they had become inured from saturated news coverage, and thereby to "penetrate deeper than CNN ever could". Herzog uses a telephoto lens, truck-mounted shots as in Fata Morgana, static shots of the workers near the oil fires, and many helicopter shots of the bleak landscape. Through avoiding establishing shots, Herzog heightens the apocalyptic effect of depicting the devastated landscape. Herzog remarked that "the film has not a single frame that can be recognised as our planet, and yet we know it must have been shot here".

Herzog's sparse commentary interprets the imagery out of its documentary context, and into a poetic fiction: the opening narration begins "A planet in our solar system / wide mountain ranges, clouds, the land shrouded in mist". The narrative stance is detached, bemused; Herzog makes no effort to explain the actual causes of the catastrophic scenes, but interprets them in epic terms with vaunting rhetoric to accompany the Wagnerian score. The workers are described as "creatures" whose behaviour is motivated by madness and a desire to perpetuate the damage that they are witnessing. A climactic scene involves the workers, shortly after succeeding in stopping the fires, re-igniting the flow of oil. The narration asks, "Has life without fire become unbearable for them?"

Reception
The film won "Grand Prix" at the Melbourne International Film Festival. At the close of its screening at the Berlin Film Festival, the audience reacted furiously to the film, rising to castigate Herzog with accusations that he had aestheticised the horror of the war. The director waved his hands fiercely and protested "You're all wrong! You're all wrong!", and later maintained Hieronymous Bosch and Goya had done likewise in their art.

The Los Angeles Times end of year review for 1992 recognised the film as "the year's most memorable documentary", describing it as "Herzog's apocalyptic, ultimately ironic view of the Gulf War". Critic Janet Maslin remarked that the director "uses his gift for eloquent abstraction to create sobering, obscenely beautiful images of a natural world that has run amok"; her colleague J. Hoberman called it "the culmination of Mr. Herzog's romantic doomsday worldview". Academic Rachel June Torbett hailed Lessons of Darkness as both "extraordinarily beautiful" and "deeply ambiguous", interpreting the decontextualisation of the geopolitical background as an avoidance which meant that the intent of the work lacked clarity.

The technique of re-contextualizing documentary footage was also used in Herzog's later film The Wild Blue Yonder.

Soundtrack
The sources of music used in the film were classical, and predominantly theatrical:
 Edvard Grieg – Peer Gynt Suite No. 1, Op. 46 (Death of Aase)
 Gustav Mahler – Symphony No. 2
 Arvo Pärt – Stabat Mater
 Sergei Prokofiev – Sonata for Two Violins, op. 56
 Franz Schubert – Notturno op. 148
 Giuseppe Verdi – Messa da Requiem – Recordare
 Richard Wagner – Das Rheingold, Parsifal, Götterdämmerung

Footnotes

References

External links
 

1992 films
French documentary films
British documentary films
Apocalyptic films
German avant-garde and experimental films
Films shot in Kuwait
Films directed by Werner Herzog
German documentary films
1990s German-language films
1990s avant-garde and experimental films
French avant-garde and experimental films
British avant-garde and experimental films
1990s British films
1990s French films
1990s German films